Nanson may refer to:
Places
Nanson, North Dakota, an unincorporated community in the United States
Nanson, Western Australia, a town in Australia
People
Edward J. Nanson (1850–1936), English mathematician in Australia
John Nanson (1863–1916), West Australian politician
William Nanson, English rugby player

A misspelling of Fridtjof Nansen's surname